Project Runway Season 2 was the second season of Bravo's successful Project Runway, a reality competition for fashion designers.  Season 2 began airing on December 7, 2005. Following a nationwide search earlier in the year, sixteen designers were chosen as semi-finalists and brought to New York City in June 2005. After the first challenge, called "Road To The Runway", fourteen went on to compete as finalists.  The winning designer, Chloe Dao, received $100,000 in seed money to help launch her own line, a 2007 Saturn Sky roadster, a spread in ELLE magazine, and a mentorship with the Banana Republic Design Team. Winning alongside Dao was her model, Grace Kelsey, who received the ELLE Magazine spread. Michael Kors and Nina Garcia returned as judges for the second season. The fourth judging seat rotated each week, based on the challenge. Tim Gunn, fashion chair at Parsons The New School for Design, returned as a mentor for the designers.

Kara Janx later appeared in Project Runway: All Stars in 2012, where she finished 7th out of 13. Andrae Gonzalo, in the same year, competed in the second season of the All Stars edition placing 10th out of 13. In 2016, Daniel Franco competed in the fifth season of the All Stars edition, placing 12th out of 13.  Third place contestant Santino Rice would later become one of the judges of another reality show, RuPaul's Drag Race.

Contestants
The 16 contestants in Season 2 were:

 
(ages listed are the designers' ages at the time the show was taped in the summer of 2005.)

Daniel F. had been a competitor in the first season and was eliminated in that season's first episode.  Determined to show that the judges "made a mistake" in eliminating him so soon, he returned to the nationwide tryouts with samples from his own design line.  The evaluation panel at the tryouts decided to give him one more chance and brought him back as a contestant for season two.

The 16 models competing for an ELLE spread in the second season were:

Designers

: Although Daniel had one of the lowest scores for the challenge, he was automatically safe as he had immunity.

 The designer won Project Runway Season 2.
  The designer won that challenge.
 The designer had the second highest score for that challenge.
 The designer had one of the highest scores for that challenge.
  The designers had one of the lowest scores for that challenge.
 The designer was in the bottom two, but was not eliminated.
  The designer lost and was eliminated from the competition.

Models

 The model was the winner of Project Runway season 2.
 The model won the challenge.
  The model wore the losing designers outfit.
 The model was brought back into the competition.
  The model withdrew from the competition.
 The model was out of Project Runway season 2.

Allison was originally eliminated in episode 2, but then was brought back after Maria withdrew.
In episode 10, the models were not used in the challenge.

Designer legend
Andrae Gonzalo: AG
Chloe Dao: CD
Daniel Franco: DF
Daniel Vosovic: DV
Diana Eng: DE
Emmett McCarthy: EM
Guadalupe Vidal: GV
Heidi Standridge: HS
John Wade: JW
Kara Janx: KJ
Kirsten Ehrig: KE
Marla Duran: MD
Nick Verreos: NV
Raymundo Baltazar: RB
Santino Rice: SR
Zulema Griffin: ZG

Episodes

Episode 1: Road To The Runway 
Original Airdate: December 7, 2005

Before arriving in New York, the 16 contestants being considered for positions in this season's competing cast were given six yards of plain white muslin, $20, and one week to create an outfit that best represents who they are as a fashion designer. After arriving, the 16 contestants found that only 14 positions were available in the Parsons workroom and thus two would be eliminated at the runway judging.

WINNER: Santino
ELIMINATED: Heidi & John

Episode 2: Clothes Off Your Back
Original Airdate: December 7, 2005

Designers made an outfit using only the clothes they were wearing at the moment the challenge was announced. They had one day to complete their designs.
This episode is best remembered for Andrae's tear-filled panic attack on the runway, and the judges relatively unfeeling response.

Guest Judge: Diane von Fürstenberg

WINNER: Chloe
ELIMINATED: Kirsten

Episode 3: All Dolled Up
Original Airdate: December 14, 2005

Designers created a life-sized outfit for the My Scene collection. The winning designer's outfit would be duplicated for the My Scene collection. The designers had a budget of $150 and two days to complete the design.

Guest Judge: Lily Martinez

WINNER: Nick
ELIMINATED: Raymundo

Episode 4: Team Lingerie
Original Airdate: December 21, 2005

Designers created a lingerie line consisting of three looks. A team event with four teams, each with a lead designer and two assistants. The designers had a budget of $200 and one day to complete the collection.

Guest Judges: Cynthia Rowley & Alessandra Ambrosio

WINNER: Daniel V. 
ELIMINATED: Daniel F.

Episode 5: Social Scene
Original Airdate: January 4, 2006

Designers created a party dress for socialite Nicky Hilton. The designers had a budget of $150 and two days to complete the designs.

Guest Judge: Nicky Hilton

WINNER: Santino
ELIMINATED: Guadalupe

Episode 6: Window Shopping
Original Airdate: January 11, 2006

Designers created a day-to-evening ensemble for Banana Republic. A team event with five teams of two. Both designers on the losing team were eliminated. Each team had to finish their garment in one day. After that, all teams went to Banana Republic and each had to make a window that showed the idea of the dress; they had 30 minutes to buy all the materials they needed for the display and an hour to finish. The winner was chosen by votes from Banana Republic clients.

The teams were:
Chloe and Emmett
Daniel V. and Andrae
Kara and Zulema
Santino and Nick
Diana and Marla

Guest Judge: Deborah Lloyd

WINNERS: Andrae & Daniel V.
ELIMINATED: Diana & Marla

Episode 7: On Thin Ice
Original Airdate: January 18, 2006

Designers created a figure skating outfit for 2006 Olympic silver medalist Sasha Cohen. The designers had a budget of $150 and two days to complete the design.

Guest Judges: Anne Slowey & Sasha Cohen

WINNER: Zulema
ELIMINATED: Emmett

Episode 8: Inspiration
Original Airdate: January 25, 2006

Designers took photos around New York and picked one to be an inspiration for an outfit. The designers had a budget of $100 and one day to complete the outfit.

This episode is most notable for Zulema's "Model Walk Off." Prior to this episode, all the winning designers stuck with their original models when given the chance to change by Heidi. Zulema stunned everyone when she not only announced she was changing models, but also making this decision by picking three girls to have a "walk off." She chose the eliminated Emmett's model Shannon, Andrae's model Danyelle, and Nick's model Tarah for consideration. She switched to Tarah, which left Rachael with Nick and eliminated Shannon.

Guest Judge: Jay McCarroll

WINNER: Daniel V.
ELIMINATED: Zulema

Episode 9: Flower Power
Original Airdate: February 1, 2006

Designers created a dress using only natural materials purchased in the New York Flower District. The designers had a budget of $100 and one hour for the purchases.

Guest Judges: Mark Badgley and James Mischka.

WINNER: Daniel V.
ELIMINATED: Andrae

Episode 10: Makeover
Original Airdate: February 8, 2006

Designers created a new look to make over a fellow contestant, who then modeled the new look on the runway.
Chloe designed for Nick, Nick designed for Daniel V., Daniel V. designed for Chloe, Kara designed for Santino, and Santino designed for Kara.

Guest Judge: Freddie Leiba
WINNER: Chloe
ELIMINATED: Nick

Episode 11: What's Your Line?
Original Airdate: February 15, 2006

Designers made an evening dress for supermodel Iman. The evening dress also reflected the line which the designers will show at Olympus Fashion Week.

Guest Judge: Iman

WINNER: Daniel V.
ELIMINATED: Kara

Episode 12: Reunion 
Original Airdate: February 22, 2006

All of the designers gathered for a reunion hosted by Tim Gunn and Heidi Klum on the eve of New York Fashion Week at which the final three designers will display their collections.

Episode 13: Finale - Part 1  
Original Airdate: March 1, 2006

The three final designers were shown at home when Tim Gunn visited them, and then returned to New York to prepare their collections for showing at New York Olympus Fashion Week. Back in New York, they were surprised to find out that they had to complete one final challenge: an additional garment that they each had to design with the aid of one eliminated designer of their choice. Nick, Andrae, and Diana returned to help Daniel V., Santino, and Chloe, respectively.

Episode 14: Finale - Part 2  
Original Airdate: March 8, 2006

Chloe, Daniel V., and Santino displayed their final collections of thirteen pieces at New York Olympus Fashion Week.

Guest Judge: Debra Messing

WINNER: Chloe
ELIMINATED: Daniel V. (1st Runner-up) & Santino (2nd Runner-up)

External links

Andrae Gonzalo official web site
Chloe Dao official web site
Daniel Franco official web site
Daniel Vosovic official web site
Diana Eng official web site
Emmett McCarthy official web site
Guadalupe Vidal official web site
Heidi Standridge official web site
Kara Janx official web site
Marla Duran official web site
Nick Verreos official web site
Raymundo Baltazar official web site
Santino Rice official web site
Zulema Griffin official web site

Project Runway (American series)
2005 in fashion
2005 American television seasons
2006 in fashion